The Earthquake Game was a college football game in which the crowd reaction after an important play registered on a seismograph. Played in front of a crowd of 79,431 at Louisiana State University's Tiger Stadium on October 8, 1988, the LSU Tigers upset No. 4 Auburn 7–6.

Background
The game pitted Southeastern Conference rivals Auburn and LSU and was one of the more notable games in the Auburn–LSU football rivalry. Along with national rankings, the game also proved to be of great significance to that season's eventual SEC title. The stadium was filled to capacity and the game was being broadcast on ESPN.

The game
The game was dominated by defense. LSU managed only one drive of over 10 yards in the first half. The only score of the first half was a field goal by Auburn's Win Lyle with 1:41 to go before halftime. LSU made it to the Auburn 23-yard line midway through the third quarter, but a clipping penalty moved the team out of field goal range. On Auburn's next possession, Lyle kicked another field goal with 10:18 left in the game to make the score 6–0.

The play
Auburn led 6–0 with less than two minutes left in the 4th quarter. LSU's quarterback Tommy Hodson drove the team down the field before throwing an 11-yard touchdown pass to Eddie Fuller on 4th down.

The seismograph reading was discovered the morning after the game by LSU seismologist Don Stevenson and student worker Riley Milner. Word of the seismograph reading reached The Daily Reveille and spread to the local media. Stevenson submitted the reading to the Louisiana Geological Survey to have it preserved. Stevenson displayed a copy of the reading on his office window on the LSU campus that was later observed by an ESPN news crew, which was on campus doing a story sometime prior to when Stevenson left LSU in the summer of 1991. The news crew decided to do a piece on what they dubbed "The Earthquake Game." This news story helped to add more attention to the event.

Aftermath and legacy

The win brought LSU's win–loss record to 3–2 on the season and a No. 19 ranking in the AP Poll. The team finished the regular season with an 8–3 record and lost to Syracuse in the Hall of Fame Bowl. Auburn dropped to 4–1 and to No. 12 in the poll. The game was the only one Auburn lost in the regular season. The team was defeated by Florida State in the Sugar Bowl.

In games played by LSU at Tiger Stadium, the winning touchdown is included in a montage that is shown at the start of the 4th quarter.

See also
Similar seismic activity has been registered during other football games: 
 2011 NFL playoff game between the Seattle Seahawks and the New Orleans Saints
 2013 Iron Bowl between Auburn and Alabama
 Seven times at Virginia Tech's Lane Stadium: first in 2011 against Miami, in 2015 against Ohio State, against Miami in 2016, against Clemson in 2017, against Notre Dame in 2018, against Miami in 2018, and against North Carolina in 2021.

References

1988 Southeastern Conference football season
Auburn Tigers football games
LSU Tigers football games
American football incidents
October 1988 sports events in the United States
1988 in sports in Louisiana
Nicknamed sporting events